Eio or EIO may refer to:
 Eio (river) in Norway
 Eio Books, an American publishing house
 Eio Sakata (1920–2010), Japanese professional Go player
 Environmental Investment Organisation
 European Investigation Order
 Extended interaction oscillator
 Enhanced Input/Output, an extension interface for printers, see JetDirect § EIO
 Eiō, one of the eight major titles of professional shogi